"Whatever Lola Wants" is a popular song, sometimes rendered as "Whatever Lola Wants, Lola Gets". The music and words were written by Richard Adler and Jerry Ross for the 1955 musical play Damn Yankees. The song is sung to Joe Hardy by Lola, the Devil's assistant, a part originated by Gwen Verdon, who reprised the role in the film. The saying was inspired by Lola Montez, an Irish-born "Spanish dancer" and mistress of King Ludwig I of Bavaria, who later became a San Francisco Gold Rush vamp.

Also recorded by

Natacha Atlas
Les Baxter
Tony Bennett (1955)
Ran Blake
Lola Blanc
Bob & Ray
Les Brown
Reeve Carney Live at Molly Malone's (2006)
Petula Clark
Alma Cogan (1957)
Annie Cordy - French version Tout ce que veut Lola (1957)
Xavier Cugat
Carla Boni
Chiwetel Ejiofor
Gracie Fields
Ella Fitzgerald (1963)
Gotan Project
The Hi-Lo's - A Musical Thrill (2006)
Molly Johnson
Louis Jordan
Stan Kenton - The Stage Door Swings (1958)
Eartha Kitt (1962)
Abbe Lane (with Tito Puente and His Orchestra (1957)
Marinella (1992, album I Marinella Tragouda Megales Kyries)
Carmen McRae (1955)
Amanda Lear: On album With Love (2006)
Sophie Milman (2007, Live at Winter Garden Theatre)
Bebe Neuwirth
Caroline O'Connor
Patti Page (1960)
Perez Prado and His Orchestra (1955)
Julius Pringles (2001)
Della Reese (1960)
Aldemaro Romero
Dinah Shore (1955)
Bria Skonberg (2017)
Dee Snider for the Dee Does Broadway album (2012)
Ruby Stewart
Anthony Strong
Mel Tormé (1960)
Sarah Vaughan (1955)
Gwen Verdon
Baby Face Willette
John Williams (Johnny Williams And His Orchestra, Rhythm In Motion, 1961)

Other instances
"Whatever Lola Wants" is the title of an episode of the 2005 television series Hot Properties and the title of an episode of ABC-TV's 1965 crime drama Honey West.

A film entitled Whatever Lola Wants, directed by Nabil Ayouch and starring Laura Ramsey as Lola, premiered on 11 December 2007 at the Dubai International Film Festival and was scheduled for release in France on 16 April 2008.

The Lola Car company is reportedly named after this song when company founder Eric Broadley heard the line "What Lola wants, Lola gets" in 1959.

Norman Bailey played the song as a trumpet solo on the first live television broadcast of The Lawrence Welk Show on July 2, 1955.

Chiwetel Ejiofor sang the song for the 2005 film Kinky Boots.

The song was also used by Mario Lopez and his partner Karina Smirnoff in Season 3 of Dancing with the Stars. Their tango to it was voted the best celebrity dance ever by the judges of DWTS on their 100th Episode show. Several seasons later, Joanna Krupa and her temporary partner Maksim Chmerkovskiy performed an Argentine tango to the song, in Season 9.

The song was featured in the 2006 French film Hors de Prix (English title, Priceless) starring Gad Elmaleh and Audrey Tatou.

The song can also be found in a 2011 Diet Pepsi commercial featuring Sofia Vergara and David Beckham.

The song can also be found in a 2014 Magnum Italian commercial, celebrating the 25th anniversary of the ice cream brand owned by the British/Dutch Unilever.

In the Pen15 episode "Bat Mitzvah," Becca (Sami Rappoport) sings "Whatever Lola Wants" as she enters her bat mitzvah reception.

References

External links
Whatever Lola Wants - versions and originals on SecondHandSongs

Damn Yankees at the Internet Broadway Database
Hot Properties episode plot summary on tv.com

Songs from musicals
Songs written by Richard Adler
Songs written by Jerry Ross (composer)
1955 songs
Sarah Vaughan songs